Blackstock/Martyn Aerodrome  is  east southeast of Blackstock, Ontario, Canada.

References

Registered aerodromes in Ontario